Amelia May Alcock (born 11 April 2000) is an Australian actress. She received an AACTA nomination for her performance in the Foxtel comedy-drama Upright (2019–2022). She made her international debut as young Rhaenyra Targaryen in the HBO fantasy series House of the Dragon (2022). For the role, Alcock was nominated for a Critics' Choice Television Award for Best Supporting Actress in a Drama Series.

Alcock was named a 2018 rising star by the Casting Guild of Australia (CGA).

Early life and education
Alcock was born 11 April 2000 and raised in Sydney, New South Wales. She has two brothers. Alcock was introduced to acting through a school production of Red Rocking Hood. She attended the local Stanmore Public School and then Newtown High School of the Performing Arts, from where she dropped out in 2018 when she was cast in Upright.

Career
Alcock made her television debut as a teenager in a 2014 episode of the Network Ten romantic comedy Wonderland. She appeared in commercials for NBN, Cadbury, KFC, and Woolworths. She starred on Disney Channel in Australia from 2015 to 2017, presenting on the short-form series B.F. Chefs and Hanging With. In 2017, Alcock landed her first named roles as Isabella Barrett in the web miniseries High Life alongside Odessa Young and Cindi Jackson in the third and final series of the ABC Television drama Janet King.

The following year, Alcock played Maya Nordenfelt in the Showcase drama Fighting Season. She also appeared in the sixth and final series of A Place to Call Home as Emma Carvolth, the Netflix series Pine Gap as Marissa Campbell, and the ABC series Les Norton as Sian Galese. In 2018 Alcock appeared in her first feature film The School. 
 
In 2019, Alcock began starring in the Foxtel comedy-drama series Upright as runaway teenager Meg, hitchhiking across 2,000 miles of the Australian outback, a contributing factor to her being presented with a Casting Guild of Australia Rising Star Award 2018. For her performance, Alcock was nominated for Best Comedy Performer at the 10th AACTA Awards, making her one of the youngest nominees in the category. Alcock returned for Upright'''s second series in 2022. She also had supporting roles as Jenny McGinty and Sam Serrato in the series The Gloaming and Reckoning, respectively.

In July 2021, it was announced Alcock had been cast as young Princess Rhaenyra Targaryen (later played by Emma D'Arcy) in the 2022 HBO fantasy series House of the Dragon, a Game of Thrones prequel and adaptation of George R. R. Martin's fictional history book Fire and Blood. Alcock garnered critical acclaim and was considered a highlight; Daniel van Bloom for CNET wrote: “the shining star of House of the Dragon's opening episodes is surely Milly Alcock as Rhaenyra. She's got an enchantingly expressive face -- a simple squinting of the eyes or a pursing of the lips can betray the range of emotions that accompany king's court politics.” For the role, Alcock received a nomination for Critics' Choice Television Award for Best Supporting Actress in a Drama Series.

In January 2023, Alcock played the main character in the music video for the song “Easy Now” by Noel Gallagher’s High Flying Birds from the band’s fourth album, Council Skies. She will make her West End stage debut in The Crucible at the Gielgud Theatre this summer.

Personal life
Prior to being cast in House of the Dragon'', Alcock lived with her family in Sydney and took on side jobs to make ends meet. She then moved to London, first staying in Primrose Hill, later moving to an East London flat.

Filmography

Film

Television

Web

Music Video

Awards and nominations

References

External links 

 
 
Easy Now - Noel Gallagher’s High Flying Birds

Living people
2000 births
21st-century Australian actresses
Actresses from Sydney
Australian expatriate actresses in the United Kingdom
Australian expatriates in England
Australian film actresses
Australian television actresses
People educated at Newtown High School of the Performing Arts